Chirac Marcov is a Romanian sprint canoer who competed in the early 2000s. He won a bronze medal in the C-4 1000 m event at the 2001 ICF Canoe Sprint World Championships in Poznań.

References

Living people
Romanian male canoeists
Year of birth missing (living people)
ICF Canoe Sprint World Championships medalists in Canadian